Edson Jair Partida Almaráz (born 13 December 1997) is a Mexican professional footballer who plays as a midfielder for Liga MX club Necaxa, on loan from Liga de Expansión MX side Atlante.

Honours
Atlante
Liga de Expansión MX: Apertura 2021, Apertura 2022
Campeón de Campeones: 2022

References

External links
 Edson Partida at Liga MX

1997 births
Living people
Association football midfielders
Mexican expatriate footballers
Expatriate soccer players in the United States
Mexican expatriate sportspeople in the United States
Tercera División de México players
Deportivo Toluca F.C. players
El Paso Locomotive FC players
Liga de Expansión MX players
Liga Premier de México players
USL Championship players
Footballers from Jalisco
People from Tala, Jalisco
Mexican footballers